The name Nida has been used for three tropical cyclones in the western north Pacific Ocean. The name was contributed by Thailand and means a name of woman.

Typhoon Nida (2004) (T0402, 04W Dindo) – Category 5 super typhoon that formed southeast of the Philippines in mid-May that reached peak strength not far from the east-central Philippines and finally became extratropical east of Japan.
Typhoon Nida (2009) (T0922, 26W, Vinta) – Powerful Category 5 super typhoon that formed within a monsoon trough 545 miles (880 km) southeast of Guam in late November and reached 10-minute peak winds of 130 mph (215 km/h)
Severe Tropical Storm Nida (2016) (T1604, 06W, Carina) – Impacted the Philippines and South China as a severe tropical storm.
Severe Tropical Storm Nida (2021)  (T2111, 15W)

Pacific typhoon set index articles